Events from the year 1786 in Canada.

Incumbents
Monarch: George III

Governors
Governor of the Province of Quebec: Frederick Haldimand
Governor of New Brunswick: Thomas Carleton
Governor of Nova Scotia: John Parr
Commodore-Governor of Newfoundland: John Byron
Governor of St. John's Island: Walter Patterson

Events
New Brunswick, Nova Scotia, and Newfoundland allowed to import goods from the United States.
Gerassin Pribilof discovers the rookeries on the islands now known as the Pribilofs.
John Molson founds his first brewery in Montreal.

Births
April 16 – John Franklin, naval officer, Arctic explorer, and author (d.1847)
June 17 – William Thompson, farmer and political figure (d.1860)
October 7 – Louis-Joseph Papineau, lawyer, politician and reformist (d.1871)
October 30 – Philippe-Joseph Aubert de Gaspé, lawyer, writer, fifth and last seigneur of Saint-Jean-Port-Joli (L'Islet County) (d.1871)
October 31 – William Morris, businessman, militia officer, justice of the peace, politician, and school administrator (d.1858)

 
Canada
1780s in Canada
86